Kalayaan Avenue is a major east–west route in Makati, Metro Manila, Philippines. For most of its length, it runs parallel to Jose P. Rizal Avenue to the north from East Rembo near Fort Bonifacio to Barangay Singkamas by the border with Santa Ana, Manila. It is interrupted by Bel-Air Village between Rockwell Drive and Epifanio de los Santos Avenue (EDSA). The avenue east of EDSA is designated as a component of National Route 190 of the Philippine highway network and is a component of Radial Road 4 (R-4) of the Metro Manila Arterial Road System.

History
Kalayaan Avenue was formerly called Pasig Line Street as it mostly followed the defunct Paco–Pasig tram line of the Manila Electric Railway (operated by Meralco) for most of its length; the street in the district of San Andres in Manila still bears that name. The line was built in 1908 but was heavily damaged during World War II. Subsequent development of the Bel-Air Village by Ayala Corporation in 1957 has led to the closure of a segment of Pasig Line west of EDSA. During the term of President Ferdinand Marcos, the road was improved and was renamed to Imelda Avenue after his wife and first lady, Imelda Marcos. Following the overthrow of the Marcos regime, the Makati local government renamed the avenue to Kalayaan (Filipino word for "Freedom").

Route description

West Kalayaan

The western section begins as a four-lane road carrying one-way eastbound traffic from the intersection with Zobel Roxas Street, behind Puregold Makati at the border of Makati and Manila as a continuation of Pasig Line Street in San Andres, Manila. It cuts across the northern portion of the city passing the residential and commercial villages of Singkamas, Tejeros, Santa Cruz, Olympia, Valenzuela, Bel-Air, and Poblacion. Between South Avenue and Nicanor Garcia Street (formerly Calle Reposo), Kalayaan bounds the Manila South Cemetery and the former Makati Catholic Cemetery to the south. It crosses into the western edge of Bel-Air and Población where St. Andrew the Apostle Parish could be found. Kalayaan then becomes a two-way road at the vicinity of Century City. East towards the intersection with Makati Avenue, Kalayaan is dominated by the Century City and Picar Place developments on the northern side where the city's next supertalls are being (or have been) constructed, such as The Stratford Residences, Trump Tower Manila, and The Gramercy Residences. At Makati Avenue, the road traverses a major entertainment and hotel district, with many nightclubs, bars and mid to low range hotels in the immediate vicinity. The section of Kalayaan east of P. Burgos Street is home to many sports pubs. It ends at a merge with Rockwell Drive by the entrance to the gated Bel-Air Village, where it continues as Mercedes Street.

East Kalayaan

East of Bel-Air at the intersection with EDSA, the avenue picks up as a 6-8 lane divided highway. It runs underneath the Kalayaan Flyover as it heads towards the entrance to Bonifacio Global City. It veers northeast at the junction with 32nd Street thereby avoiding the Bonifacio Global City. The road continues in this manner as it heads into Guadalupe Nuevo and Cembo, bending eastwards just before coming to an intersection with 8th Avenue in West Rembo. East of 8th Avenue, the eastbound lane of Kalayaan is becoming part of Taguig where it forms the northern border of Bonifacio Global City with its North Bonifacio district dominating the stretch. The road transverses in Makati, crossing Carlos P. Garcia Avenue (C-5) at the Circumferential Road 5–Kalayaan Avenue Interchange and ends at J.P. Rizal Avenue Extension in East Rembo. Then it continues towards San Joaquin, Pasig as San Guillermo Avenue.

References

Streets in Metro Manila